is the seventh studio album by Swedish singer-songwriter Lars Winnerbäck, released in 2004.

Track listing
"" – 3:16 - Look Around You
"" – 3:32 - Seems like Someone Is Back
"" – 4:38 - Elegy
"" – 3:55 - I'm with You Again
"" – 4:57 - The Empty Steps
"" – 3:55 - The Queen of Hearts' Final Song
"" – 3:22 - Poor
"" – 4:14 - She Comes from Foreign Plains
"" – 3:53 - The Final Dreams Part II
"" – 6:50

Charts

References 

2004 albums
Lars Winnerbäck albums